Sorbus subcordata is a species of plant in the family Rosaceae. It is endemic to Germany.

References

Flora of Germany
subcordata
Vulnerable plants
Endemic flora of Germany
Taxonomy articles created by Polbot